Jeanne Fallières (24 May 1849 – 29 September 1939) was the spouse of French president Armand Fallières.

She did not like her public duties and was given a name for being stingy and misusing her position for economic purposes.

See also 
 List of wives and companions of the President of France
 Armand Fallières

People from Nérac
1849 births
1939 deaths
Spouses of French presidents
Spouses of prime ministers of France